Time for Truth is the second album by Simon Collins.

Track listing
 "Time for Truth" (Simon Collins) – 6:39
 "Use Your Imagination" (Collins, Markie J) – 3:47
 "Reason" (Collins, Paul Schulte) – 4:38
 "Hold On" (Collins) – 4:15
 "Man on TV" (Collins) – 4:59
 "Out on the Playa" (Collins, Johan Daansen) – 3:07
 "Sunburn" (Collins, A.K.-S.W.I.F.T.) – 5:16
 "Home" (Collins) – 4:47
 "Mirror" (Mike Callewaert, Kemal Morris) – 4:31
 "One Nation" (Collins, Ahmed Azzamouri, A.K.-S.W.I.F.T., Anthony Rother) – 5:23
 "Super Cell" (Collins, Julian Styles) – 4:45
 "Awesome Machinery" (Collins) – 4:18

Songs recorded, but did not make album final cut
 "Heal in Time" – 4:04
 "Belong (Here I Am)" – 5:18

Personnel 
 Simon Collins – vocals, keyboards (1-8, 10, 11, 12), guitars (1, 4, 5, 6, 8, 10), drums (1-6, 8, 10, 11, 12)
 Sean McKay – keyboards (6)
 Schallbau – keyboards (9), programming (9)
 Ahmed Azzamouri – keyboards (10)
 Marcus Deml – guitars (2, 3, 5, 7, 8, 12)
 Andy Blöcher – guitars (4)
 Mark Hensley – guitars (5, 11)
 Kelly Nordstrom – guitars (6)
 A.C. Boutsen – guitars (9)
 Oliver Poschmann – bass (6)
 Julian Styles – bass (11)
 Paul Schutle – drums (7)
 Elvira – backing vocals (1)
 Markie J – rap (2)
 Nena Gerhard – backing vocals (3)
 A.K.-S.W.I.F.T. – rap (7, 10)

Production 
 Simon Collins – producer, design
 Gareth Jones – additional producer 
 Paul Schutle – co-producer, engineer 
 Cet Merlin – co-producer (1, 2), mixing (1, 2)
 Sean McKay – co-producer (6)
 Schallbau – producers (9), mixing (9)
 Julian Styles – co-producer (11)
 Peter Steiber – additional vocal producer 
 ST Schmidt – additional engineer 
 Shael Wrinch – additional engineer 
 Sarah Andresen – mixing (3, 4, 7, 8, 10, 12)
 Chris von Rautenkranz – mixing (3, 4, 7, 8, 10, 12)
 Mark Hensley – mixing (5, 6, 11), co-producer (6), mastering (9)
 Andrew Fedorow – production manager 
 Art & Werbeteam – design
 Cocodesign.de, Tummytech.com and spm music.biz – additional graphics 
 Gordon Dumka – cover photography 
 Ralf Strathmann – cover photography

Studios
 Recorded at Fusion Music, Elektrovolt and Schallbau Studio (Frankfurt, Germany); Gismo 7 Studio (Motril, Spain); Beatty Lane Studio, Lightyears and Desolation Sound Studios (Vancouver, British Columbia, Canada).
 Mixed at Soundgarten Tonstudio (Oldenburg, Germany); Schallbau Studio; Lightyears.

References

External links
 Simon Collins' website

2005 albums
Simon Collins albums